Girolamo Forabosco or Gerolamo Forabosco (1605 – 23 January 1679) was an Italian painter of the Baroque period.

He was active in Padua and his birthplace of Venice, where he was enrolled in the  Venetian Fraglia dei Pittori between 1634–39 and paid taxes in Venice from 1640-44. He was a pupil of Alessandro Varotari (il Padovanino), and influenced in Venice by Bernardo Strozzi. Gregorio Lazzarini and Pietro Bellotto were among his pupils.  He died in Padua.

Sources

Web gallery of Art
David with head of Goliath from Liechtenstein collection.

1605 births
1679 deaths
17th-century Italian painters
Italian male painters
Painters from Venice
Italian Baroque painters